Maryellen Jackson (born 3 December 1967) is a former Bermudian woman cricketer. She made her international debut for Bermuda at the 2008 Women's Cricket World Cup Qualifier.

References

External links 
 

1967 births
Living people
Bermudian women cricketers